Gustavo Di Lella (born 6 October 1973) is an Argentinian footballer who played in The Football League for Darlington, Hartlepool United and Scarborough.

References

Argentine footballers
Blyth Spartans A.F.C. players
Darlington F.C. players
Hartlepool United F.C. players
Scarborough F.C. players
Durham City A.F.C. players
English Football League players
1973 births
Living people
Association football midfielders
Footballers from Buenos Aires